"Thank You Very Much" is a song by Polish singer Margaret. It was included on her first extended play (EP) All I Need (2013), and later also on her debut studio album Add the Blonde (2014). The song was written by Thomas Karlsson and Joakim Buddee, and produced by Ant Whiting.

In May 2012, Margaret debuted "Thank You Very Much" at the 2012 TOPtrendy Festival at Sopot's Forest Opera amphitheatre, and the song was released to Polish contemporary hit radio. Shortly thereafter, Margaret's management decided to withdraw the song from radio stations and designed a promotional plan before re-releasing it. The song was released for digital download in Poland on 21 February 2013 along with its music video directed by Chris Piliero. "Thank You Very Much" was later released in various other markets. It charted in the top 50 in Austria, Germany and Italy. The song won an award as the third-best-selling digital single of 2013 in Poland by a Polish artist.

Margaret represented Poland at the 2013 Baltic Song Contest with "Thank You Very Much", and finished in second place.

Music video
The song's music video, in which Margaret appeared surrounded by 30 nude extras, was released on YouTube in February 2013. It was filmed in Los Angeles, and its direction was handled by Chris Piliero. Shortly after its release, the video was removed by YouTube for violating the website's policy against nudity and sexual content; it was later restored with age restrictions. Following this, Margaret expressed her support of the right to nudity under the slogan, "Liberty, Equality, Fraternity", and criticised YouTube for censorship. The video received substantial media coverage, contributing to the international success of "Thank You Very Much". A year after its release, it appeared on the website 9GAG, which increased its YouTube traffic to more than 500,000 views in 24 hours. The video won the Eska Music Award for Best Video.

Track listing
Digital single
 "Thank You Very Much" (UK Radio Version) – 3:10
 "Thank You Very Much" (Radio Version) – 3:09
 "Thank You Very Much" (Extended Version) – 4:21

Digital single – Remix
 "Thank You Very Much" (DJ Tr-Meet Remix) – 4:10

Digital EP – Remixes
 "Thank You Very Much" (Vital G Remix Radio Edit) – 4:09
 "Thank You Very Much" (Vital G Remix) – 5:49
 "Thank You Very Much" (Vital G Club Remix) – 6:14
 "Thank You Very Much" (Vital G Club Remix Edit) – 3:48

CD single
 "Thank You Very Much" (Radio Edit) – 3:10
 "Thank You Very Much" (Single Edit) – 3:09
 "Thank You Very Much" (Extended Version) – 4:21

Accolades

Charts

Weekly charts

Release history

See also
Nudity in music videos

References

2013 singles
2013 songs
Magic Records singles
Margaret (singer) songs
Music videos directed by Chris Marrs Piliero
Song recordings produced by Ant Whiting
Songs with lyrics by Thomas Karlsson